Hugel & Fils is a winery in Riquewihr, Alsace, France.

Hugel, Hügel or von Hügel may also refer to:

People
 Baron Charles von Hügel (1795–1870), Austrian army officer, diplomat, botanist, and explorer
 Baron Friedrich von Hügel (1852–1925), Austrian Roman Catholic laymana and religious writer, son of Charles
 Baron Anatole von Hügel (1854–1928), co-founder St Edmund's College in Cambridge, son of Charles
 Baroness Pauline von Hügel (1858–1901), Italian-born Austrian baroness, British writer, philanthropist, daughter of Charles
 Gustav Hügel, Austrian figure skater, 1897 and 1899-1900 world champion
 Jean Hugel (1924–2009), Alsatian wine producer
 Max Hugel (1925–2007), American businessman and government official

Other uses
 Villa Hügel, a mansion belonging to the Krupp family, in Bredeney, Germany
 Von Hügel Institute, an academic research institute based at Cambridge, England

See also
 Erika Hügel-Marshall (born 1947), Afro-German author and activist
 Essen-Hügel station, station in Essen, Germany
 Bernard Hügl (1908-1982), Croatian football player and manager